The Four Preps are an American popular music male quartet. In the 1950s, 1960s, and 1970s, the group amassed eight gold singles and three gold albums. Their million-selling signature tunes included "26 Miles (Santa Catalina)", "Big Man", "Lazy Summer Night", and "Down by the Station".

The Four Preps' numerous television and motion picture appearances included four years backing teen heartthrob Ricky Nelson on The Adventures of Ozzie and Harriet and appearing with Sandra Dee in the film Gidget. The group's most recent television appearance was with the award-winning 2004 PBS special, Magic Moments: The Best of 50s Pop.

The current incarnation of the Four Preps features co-founder and original lead singer Bruce Belland, Bob Duncan (formerly with the Diamonds and the Crew Cuts), Michael Redman (of the Crew Cuts), and Jim Armstrong. Their shows are currently an amalgamation of singing everything from doo-wop to Tin Pan Alley standards and comedy.

Original line-up
 Bruce Belland, lead vocals (born October 22, 1936, Chicago, Illinois)
 Ed Cobb, bass (born February 28, 1938; died September 19, 1999)
 Marv Ingram, high tenor (born Marvin Inabnett July 29, 1938; died March 7, 1999)
 Glen A. Larson, baritone (born January 3, 1937 Los Angeles, California; died November 14, 2014)

History
The four original members were students at Hollywood High School and were signed to a recording contract by Capitol Records, after one of Capitol's executives saw them at a talent show at that school in 1956. They had a minor chart hit that year with "Dreamy Eyes" and between 1956 and 1964 reached the Billboard pop charts with 13 different songs. In 1957 they appeared with Lindsay Crosby, Bing Crosby's son, in the television special The Edsel Show.

Their biggest hit was "26 Miles (Santa Catalina)," which was written by Belland and Larson in 1957 and reached number two early the following year. The record sold over one million copies, earning a gold disc.  Around this time, Ricky Nelson appeared with them at a Hamilton High School lunch hour assembly singing "Blue Moon of Kentucky".

Belland and Larson also wrote "Big Man", which reached number three in 1958. In the United Kingdom, it peaked at number two on the UK Singles Chart, thus becoming the group's biggest hit there. The pair also composed new lyrics for the older tune "Down by the Station", which peaked at number 13 in 1960. Cobb wrote a handful of songs for the group, though not any of their chart hits; Cobb later became a noted writer and/or producer of hit material for other artists, especially The Standells' "Dirty Water", Brenda Holloway's "Every Little Bit Hurts" and Gloria Jones' "Tainted Love," later recorded by Soft Cell.  Many Four Preps records were arranged by their high school friend and piano accompanist Lincoln Mayorga.

In 1959, the group appeared as themselves in the film Gidget. For a short period, Don Clarke replaced Ingram while the latter finished college at UCLA, but he rejoined the group in 1960.

The group was known for its family-friendly comedic humor in live performances. In 1960, they recorded a parody single, "More Money for You and Me," which included single parody verses of several popular songs by The Fleetwoods, The Hollywood Argyles, The Platters, The Four Freshmen, The Kingston Trio and Dion and the Belmonts. The title parody, sung to the tune of "Tom Dooley," went like this:

 Hang down the Kingston Trio,
 Hang 'em from a tall oak tree;
 Eliminate the Kingston Trio;
 More money for you and me.

In 1962, they released another novelty record "The Big Draft", where they "suggest" a couple of American groups to go drafting themselves by parodying their songs. The record once again included single parody verses from popular hits of the day, this time from The Platters, The Four Aces, The Marcels, The Highwaymen (the folk band), and Dion (who split with the Belmonts in 1960).

Both "More Money for You and Me" and "The Big Draft" were recorded live.

The group last appeared on the Billboard Hot 100 singles chart in 1964, when "A Letter to The Beatles" charted for a total of three weeks beginning March 21, peaking at number 85 before being pulled from sale. The arrival of The Beatles, along with the rest of the British Invasion, coincided with the decline of popularity of the Four Preps and most other folk revival groups. In 1966, David Somerville, formerly of The Diamonds, joined the group, replacing Cobb. In 1969, the group disbanded, as their type of music had become less popular.  Belland and Somerville occasionally performed as a duo after the breakup.

Later careers 
Belland continued writing songs for other singers, as well as writing television show scripts, eventually becoming a network executive. Belland was a producer on several game shows in the 1970s for Ralph Edwards Productions.  Cobb became a record producer and sound engineer.  He composed and produced the top-twenty hit, "Dirty Water" for The Standells in 1966 with Cobb; "Every Little Bit Hurts " for Brenda Holloway; "Tainted Love" for Gloria Jones, which became a worldwide hit for Soft Cell in 1982.  Somerville went into television acting and providing voice-overs.  Larson became a television producer/writer/director, creating Battlestar Galactica, Knight Rider and variety television series; he and Somerville would reunite to collaborate on the song "Unknown Stuntman," the theme song to another one of Larson's TV series, The Fall Guy.  Ingram became a commodities broker.  Clarke became a music teacher at Glendora High School. Don Clarke was a music director at Mark Keppel High School, Alhambra, California, from 1965 to 1967.

In the 1980s, Belland, Cobb, Somerville, and Jim Pike (formerly of the Lettermen) eventually formed a new "Four Preps" group and went on to perform.  Jim Yester, formerly of The Association, replaced Pike in 1993, and the group became the "New Four Preps".

In March 1999, Ingram died of a heart attack; Cobb died of leukemia in Honolulu, Hawaii later the same year.

Yester, Belland and Somerville then recorded and toured for a short time as “Triple Gold – The Three Tenors of Pop” and then moved on to pursue individual opportunities. In 2004 PBS asked Bruce to put together a one shot version of the Four Preps for “Magic Moments”, a PBS Special saluting the hit makers of the 1950s. Bruce, Glen Larson, Jim Yester and David Somerville performed on that show as The Four Preps and the program has become one of Public television's biggest fund raisers. Somerville died on July 14, 2015.

Belland's daughters, Tracey Bryn Belland and Melissa Brooke Belland, followed in their father's footsteps as singers, forming a group named Voice of the Beehive.

Discography

Albums
 The Four Preps (1958)
 The Things We Did Last Summer (1958)
 Dancing and Dreaming (1959)
 Down by the Station (1960)
 The Four Preps on Campus (1961)
 Campus Encore (1962)

Singles

References

External links

Biography on The Iceberg site
 Beatles novelties. Accessed January 7, 2009.
Another biography
Printable Biography of the New Four Preps (pdf format)

1956 establishments in California
Capitol Records artists
American pop music groups
American vocal groups
Musical groups from Los Angeles
Musical groups established in 1956
Vocal quartets
Traditional pop music singers